Wretched may refer to:
Wretched (punk band)
Wretched (doom metal band)
Wretched (metal band), a death metal band from Charlotte
The Wretched (film), a 2020 supernatural horror film by the Pierce Brothers
"The Wretched", a song by The Word Alive from their album, Deceiver
"The Wretched", a song by Attack Attack! from their album, This Means War
The Wretched, an English translation of Les Misérables
"The Wretched", a song by Nine Inch Nails from their album, The Fragile
Wretched and Divine: The Story of the Wild Ones, Black Veil Brides' third studio album